Seacroft railway station was a station in Seacroft, Lincolnshire.

The station was opened on 28 July 1873 and originally called Cow Bank, but was renamed to Seacroft on 1 October 1900.  Passenger services were withdrawn 7 December 1953 due to lack of use, and the station was closed to goods on 27 April 1964. The line it was on, between Boston and Skegness is still open.

See also
Firsby to Skegness railway branch line

References

Disused railway stations in Lincolnshire
Former Great Northern Railway stations
Railway stations in Great Britain opened in 1873
Railway stations in Great Britain closed in 1953